"Caught in the Rain" is a song by American post-grunge band Revis that first appeared in the end credits to Daredevil, and was also included in the film's soundtrack Daredevil: The Album. It was released in April 2003 as the lead single from the band's debut album, Places for Breathing. The track was the band's highest charting song, being a top 10 hit on the Billboard Mainstream Rock chart.

Overview
The single peaked at #20 on the Alternative Songs chart on June 7, 2003 and stayed on the chart for 16 weeks. Over a month later on July 19, the song peaked at #8 on the Mainstream Rock chart, staying on the chart for 26 weeks.

Music video
The song's music video was directed by Steven Murashige, who had previously directed videos for Incubus and Rage Against the Machine.

The music video shows the band performing the song on a stage in a black room. The video cuts back and forth between the band performing and a woman sitting alone in a similar black room. As the video ends, the woman gets up and walks away.

Track listing

Chart performance

Personnel
Revis
 Justin Holman – vocals
 Robert Davis – guitar
 Nathaniel Cox – guitar
 Bob Thiemann – bass

Additional
 Josh Freese – drums

Production
 Don Gilmore – production
 Andy Wallace – mixing

References

External links
 Official Music Video at YouTube

2003 songs
2003 singles
Epic Records singles
Post-grunge songs